Cardiodectes is a genus of copepods in the family Pennellidae. Species are parasites of fish.

Species
There are 15 species:
Cardiodectes medusaeus (Wilson C.B., 1908) is a synonym of Cardiodectes bellottii.

References 

 Uyeno, D. 2013: Two new species of Cardiodectes Wilson, 1917 (Copepoda: Siphonostomatoida: Pennellidae) from gobiid fishes (Actinopterygii: Perciformes) in the western Pacific Ocean. Zootaxa 3664(3), pages 301–311, 
 Uyeno, D.; Nagasawa, K. 2010: Three new species of the family Pennellidae (Copepoda: Siphonostomatoida) from gobiid fishes (Actinopterygii: Perciformes) in coastal waters of the western Pacific Ocean. Zootaxa, 2687, pages 29–44

Siphonostomatoida
Copepod genera